Yuquanying Subdistrict is a subdistrict situated in the east of Fengtai District, Beijing, China. It shares border with Taipingqiao and You'anmen Subdistricts in the north, Xiluoyuan and Majiabao Subdistricts in the east, Huaxiang Subdistrict in the south, Kandang and Xincun Subdistricts in the west.

The subdistrict was formed from parts of Huaixang Township and Xincun Subdistrict in 2021.

Administrative divisions 
In 2021, Yuquanying Subdistrict had 11 subdivisions, with 8 of them being communities and 3 being villages:

Gallery

See also 

 List of township-level divisions of Beijing

References 

Fengtai District
Subdistricts of Beijing